Aenictus luteus is a species of brown army ant found in Sierra Leone and Cote D'Ivoire.

References

Dorylinae
Hymenoptera of Africa
Insects described in 1892